Playland Park may refer to:

Playland (New York), an amusement park in Rye, New York
Playland Park (Indiana), a former amusement park in South Bend, Indiana
Playland Park (Houston, Texas), a former amusement park in Houston
Playland Park (San Antonio, Texas), a former amusement park in San Antonio

See also
Playland (disambiguation)
Dodge Park Playland in Council Bluffs, Iowa